The Theban Tomb TT1 is located in Deir el-Medina, part of the Theban Necropolis, on the west bank of the Nile, opposite to Luxor. It is the burial place of the ancient Egyptian official, Sennedjem and his family.

Description

The tomb was found in 1886 and was undisturbed. It contained over 20 burials, most of them certainly belonging to family members of Sennedjem.  Sennedjem was placed in an outer box coffin with one inner human shaped one and a mummyboard.  His wife Iyneferti had one human shaped coffin with a mummy board, while his son Khonsu was again placed in an outer box and one inner human shaped coffin, again with a mummy board.  The wife of Khonsu was Tameket, placed into one coffin with a mummy board.  For other people buried here the relation to Sennedjem is not clear. Burial goods included many shabtis, canopic chests and pieces of furniture. The objects were sold to several collections around the world; the most important items went to Cairo, New York and Berlin.

The north chapel was dedicated to Sennedjem's son Khons. In the chapel another son of Sennedjem is depicted. Khabekhnet (whose tomb is located nearby in TT2) was named after his paternal grandfather.

See also
 List of Theban tombs
 N. de Garis Davies, Nina and Norman de Garis Davies, Egyptologists

References

External Resources

 Actual photographs of the Theban Tomb: TT1
Theban tomb tracings made by Norman and Nina de Garis Davies

 Unfolding Sennedjem's Tomb by Hany Farid and Samir Farid (PDF, englisch; 1,6 MB)
 Deir el-Medina, Tomb TT1, Sennedjem (Osirisnet) 
  Tomb of Sennedjem, Servant in the Place of Truth 

Buildings and structures completed in the 13th century BC
Theban tombs